Big Island is an island in Chemung County, New York. It is located southeast of Elmira, on the Chemung River.

References

River islands of New York (state)
Landforms of Chemung County, New York
Islands of New York (state)